The 2014 Men's Asian Games Rugby sevens Tournament was held in Incheon Namdong Asiad Rugby Field, Incheon, South Korea from September 30 to October 2, 2014.

Squads

Results
All times are Korea Standard Time (UTC+09:00)

Preliminary round

Pool A

Pool B

Pool C

Summary

Classification 9th–12th

Semifinals

Classification 11th–12th

Classification 9th–10th

Final round

Quarterfinals

Semifinals 5th–8th

Semifinals

Classification 7th–8th

Classification 5th–6th

Bronze medal match

Gold medal match

Final standing

References
Results summary

External links
Official website

Men